Patrick Joseph Buckley aka P. J. Buckley (born c. 1956) is a former Gaelic footballer who played for the Dublin county team. Buckley won the All-Ireland Senior Football Championship with Dublin in 1983. He played his club football for the Erin's Isle Club in Finglas, Dublin. Son's Lorcan and Fintan represented their county with pride in hurling and football.

Also an accomplished hurler lining out for the Dubs at senior level too.  1983 was a good year at this code for PJ as he was part of the Erin's Isle team that won the Dublin Senior Hurling Championship that season. Another son named Kevin tried his hand at Gaelic too but was much better at tennis.

External links
 Article on the Summer of 83'

1950s births
Living people
Dublin inter-county Gaelic footballers
Gaelic football backs
Erins Isle Gaelic footballers
Winners of one All-Ireland medal (Gaelic football)